The Sheffield Parkway is a major dual carriageway which runs between the City of Sheffield and junction 33 of the M1 in South Yorkshire, England. The  road was opened in 1974.

Route
The route runs east of the City, connecting Park Square in the city centre with the inner ring road, outer ring road and out to the M1 motorway at junction 33. It passes the districts of the city council which are former villages: Wybourn, Darnall and Handsworth and the large village of Catcliffe, at which a slip road connects to Sheffield Business Park and the Advanced Manufacturing Park (AMP). At Handsworth the road passes through Bowden Housteads Woods, where it is possible to see the Parkway Man statue. Many businesses and Sheffield attractions are within sight of The Parkway, as it is known in South Yorkshire, and it can become highly congested. For approximately  the road forms part of the A57; the rest is part of the A630. The South Yorkshire Fire and Rescue service Parkway Fire Station, which opened on 14 July 2015, has direct access to the Parkway, via Reynolds Road, at the junction of the A57 and A630.

A £46 million upgrade to create three lanes between Catcliffe junction to the M1 on both carriageways, and four lanes on the M1 slip roads, started in February 2021 with a completion date of autumn 2022. The upgrade will also include new barriers, traffic lights, resurfacing and a permanent speed restriction of 50 mph.

Junctions

See also
Parkway Man

References

External links 

 Sheffield City Council Live Traffic Cameras
 Park Square North - Commercial Street, Exchange Place, Parkway, Broad Street
 Bernard Road - Parkway - Parkway, Cutlers Gate, Bernard Road, Cricket Inn Road
 Handsworth Road - Parkway - Handsworth Road, Parkway

Roads in Sheffield